Alex Tew is a British entrepreneur who is most famous for having founded The Million Dollar Homepage in 2005, at the age of 21, which earned him his first million in only 5 months. In late 2008, he made the headline-hitting Flash game Sock and Awe, and in 2012, a meditation app called Calm.

References

Living people
Year of birth missing (living people)